The 1941 BYU Cougars football team was an American football team that represented (BYU) as a member of the Mountain States Conference (MSC) during the 1941 college football season. In their fifth season under head coach Eddie Kimball, the Cougars compiled an overall record of 4–3–2 with a mark of 3–1–2 against conference opponents, tied for second place in the MSC, and outscored opponents by a total of 136 to 100.

Schedule

References

BYU
BYU Cougars football seasons
BYU Cougars football